Ruža (Serbo-Croatian for "Rose") may refer to:

 Ruža (given name)
 Ruža na asfaltu
 Ruža vetrova Beograda
 Ruža vjetrova

See also
 
 Ruza (disambiguation)
 Ružica (disambiguation) ("little Ruža")